Rhododendron wallichii (簇毛杜鹃) is a rhododendron species native to northeastern India, eastern Nepal, Bhutan, Sikkim, and southern Xizang in China, where it grows at altitudes of . The flowers are purple-red to white, with red spots. Some authorities consider it a synonym of Rhododendron campanulatum.

Synonyms
 Rhododendron campanulatum var. wallichii 
 Rhododendron heftii

References

 "Rhododendron wallichii", J. D. Hooker, Rhododendr. Sikkim-Himalaya. 1: t. 5. 1849.

wallichii
Flora of Bhutan